Josef Rudolf Waldberg (born Mainz, Germany), known as Jose Waldberg, was a German national (then aged 25), who, with his accomplice, Karl Heinrich Meier, a Dutchman of German origin (then aged 24), was hanged at Pentonville Prison in London on 10 December 1940, following their conviction at the Old Bailey the previous month after a trial in front of Mr Justice Wrottesley.

The spies were sent to Britain in preparation for the planned German invasion, which never arrived.  When questioned by the Intelligence Services Waldberg told them that he would soon be in charge.  At his trial Waldberg finally realised the seriousness of his situation and told the court that he'd only taken the mission because his father was in trouble with the Gestapo.  Waldberg also admitted that he wasn't a fully trained spy, but that he was studying it.

During the entire Second World War, Waldberg was the only ethnic German who actually volunteered to go to Britain to spy. In total 116 spies were sent. The three caught with him were Dutch, which caused the British authorities to detain all asylum seekers from Europe and screen them, or in some cases detain them on the Isle of Man. These were the first executions under the Treason Act.

They both spoke good English, and carried papers showing them to be Dutch refugees from the Nazis.

References

1910 births
1940 deaths
Executed people from Rhineland-Palatinate
Aliens executed under the Treachery Act 1940
People from Mainz
People executed by the United Kingdom by hanging